Claude Véga (2 June 1930 – 11 April 2022) was a French impressionist, humourist, and actor.

References

External links
 
 

1930 births
2022 deaths
Male actors from Paris
Officiers of the Ordre des Arts et des Lettres
French male comedians
French impressionists (entertainers)
French male film actors
French male stage actors
20th-century French male actors
20th-century French comedians